CIBM-FM is a French-language Canadian radio station located in Rivière-du-Loup, Quebec.

Owned and operated by Groupe Radio Simard, it broadcasts on 107.1 MHz with an effective radiated power of 100,000 watts using an omnidirectional antenna (class C). The station has a CHR/Top 40 format branded as FM 107.

The station rebroadcasts CKOI-FM Montreal from 6 p.m. to 6:30 a.m.

CIBM was launched in 1966 as CHGB-FM at 102.9 FM, until it moved to its current frequency in 1982. The CIBM call sign was later adopted at an unknown date.

In 1986, it was authorized to increase its effective radiated power to 100,000 watts.

Rebroadcasters

References

External links
FM 107
 

Ibm
Ibm
Ibm
Mass media in Rivière-du-Loup
Ibm
Radio stations established in 1966
1966 establishments in Quebec